Monolith Productions, Inc. is an American video game developer based in Kirkland, Washington. The company has been a subsidiary of Warner Bros. Games since August 2004.

History 
Monolith Productions was founded on October 25, 1994 by Brian Goble, Brian Waite, Bryan Bouwman, Garrett Price, Jace Hall, Paul Renault, and Toby Gladwell.

Co-founder Brian Goble had this to say regarding the company name.

 
The company is best known for the Blood, No One Lives Forever and F.E.A.R series. Monolith developed the LithTech game engine which was used for most of their games starting with Shogo: Mobile Armor Division in September 1998. Between 1997 and 1999, Monolith also published games–some developed by the studio, some by third parties.

In 2004, Monolith Productions was acquired by Warner Bros. Interactive Entertainment (now Warner Bros. Games).

In 2014, the company released the title Middle-earth: Shadow of Mordor with a sequel entitled Middle-earth: Shadow of War being released in 2017.

In 2021, the company announced that they are developing a video game starring Wonder Woman.

Video games

Developed

Published

References

External links
Official website
Monolith Productions profile on MobyGames
Monolith Productions entry on Giant Bomb
Monolith Productions history

 
2004 mergers and acquisitions
Companies based in Kirkland, Washington
American companies established in 1994
Video game companies established in 1994
Video game companies of the United States
Video game development companies
Warner Bros. Games
1994 establishments in Washington (state)